Felipe Alessandri Vergara (born 4 February 1975) is a Chilean politician who served as mayor of Santiago Centro. He is militant of centre-right party National Renewal (RN).

Political career
In 2016, he won the municipal elections to Carolina Tohá from centre-left party Party for Democracy (PPD).

In 2021, he lost the municipal elections against leftist economist Irací Hassler from Communist Party.

References

External links
 

1975 births
Living people
21st-century Chilean politicians
Chilean people of Italian descent
Chilean politicians
National Renewal (Chile) politicians
Finis Terrae University alumni
Mayors of Santiago
People from Santiago